50 St. Catherine's Drive is the seventh and final album by singer-songwriter Robin Gibb, released on 29 September 2014 in the United Kingdom and 30 September 2014 in the United States on Rhino Records. The album was named after the address on the Isle of Man where Gibb and his family lived. The album was also co-produced and remastered by his son Robin-John Gibb (RJ Gibb) who had two years previously, composed the album ‘Titanic Requiem’ with his father. For 50 St. Catherine’s Drive Robin-John also composed and produced, with his father, the songs ‘Instant Love’ and ‘One Way Love’ the latter song ‘One Way Love’ which Robin and Robin-John both composed and produced along with their long-term family friend, former BBC DJ and host of ‘Top of the Pops’ Mike Read and the former song ‘Instant Love’ features Robin-John singing with his father. The final track ‘Sydney’ is the last song ever recorded by Robin Gibb, a song which he had intended to sing together with Barry, however his health would not permit it, and the duet would never be.  So Robin-John (RJ) called Elliot Cohen who owns the famous Red Bus Recording Studios in London, reserved a space for a month, and eventually emerged after finally producing a poignant song worthy of airplay and commercial release, from what was originally a rough iPad GarageBand recorded demo. The album was released two years after his death in 2012.  As well as the production of ‘Sydney’ all the other unreleased tracks were remastered at Red Bus Recording Studios in London. The album reached No. 70 in the United Kingdom and No. 39 in Germany.

Background
In December 2007, Gibb told the BBC radio that he was working on a new studio album to release it in 2008. A new title he mentioned was "Days of Wine and Roses" and later in February 2008, he claimed on Dubai Radio that the song was a possible single. He also recorded a remake of "Avalanche", a 1970 song from his unreleased studio album Sing Slowly Sisters. In March 2008, Gibb revealed that he was working with Peter-John Vettese of Jethro Tull again.

A remake of "I Am the World" from 1966, which was written by him, was rewritten with Vettese. "Alan Freeman Days" was previously released in Songs from the British Academy, Volume 1. The original version of "Instant Love", with son Robin-John Gibb on lead vocals, was released on the soundtrack of Blood Type – The Search, while the newer version of the song that was included on this album features Robin singing the first verse and Robin-John singing the second verse (with both on the chorus). "Sydney" was previously released as a single in 2011 — the last song Gibb recorded.

Track listing

Personnel
Robin Gibb – vocals
Peter John Vettese – guitar, bass, keyboards, drums, programming, backing vocals
Mark "Tufty" Evans – engineer

Charts

References

2014 albums
Robin Gibb albums
Rhino Records albums
Albums published posthumously
Soul albums by English artists
Neo soul albums
Contemporary R&B albums by English artists